Two ships of the United States Navy have been named Wintle.

 was an  built at Mare Island Navy Yard and launched in 1943 as BDE-25. She was intended for transfer to the Royal Navy but was reallocated to the US Navy, taking the name Wintle from DE-266, which went to the UK in her place.  She served in the Pacific in World War II and was decommissioned in November 1945.
 was an Evarts-class destroyer escort laid down at Boston.  She was allocated to the Royal Navy in place of DE-25 (above) and was commissioned as HMS Capel in August 1943. She was torpedoed by U-486 on 26 December 1944.

United States Navy ship names